Mongolic may refer to:
Mongolic languages
Mongolic peoples, various peoples who speak Mongolic languages
Mongols, people who speak a Mongolic language in Mongolia

Language and nationality disambiguation pages